Charles Atwood or Charles Attwood may refer to:

 Charles B. Atwood (1849–1896), architect in the city of Chicago
 Charles Attwood (1791–1875), English industrialist and politician, founder of the Weardale Iron and Coal Company 

 Charles W. Attwood (1891–1964), American Architect, Creator of Unistrut
 Charles R. Attwood (1932–1998), American pediatrician